Catherine Mary Conybeare  (born 1966) is an academic and philologist and an authority on Augustine of Hippo. She is currently Leslie Clark Professor in the Humanities at Bryn Mawr College in Pennsylvania.

Academic career
Conybeare was born in 1966 at Bristol in the United Kingdom and was educated at Oxford High School (1975–1979), Simon Langton Girls' Grammar School (1979–1982), and The King's School, Canterbury (1982–1984). She read Classics at Corpus Christi College, Oxford (BA, 1985–1989) and did graduate work in Medieval Studies at the University of Toronto (MA, 1991; PhD, 1997) under the supervision of Brian Stock.  From 1996 to 2002 she was at the University of Manchester, including three years as a British Academy Post-Doctoral Fellow in the Department of Classics and Ancient History. In 2002, Conybeare moved back across the Atlantic to take up a position at Bryn Mawr College, where she was promoted to Full Professor in the Department of Greek, Latin, and Classical Studies in 2011. She served as Director of the Graduate Group in Archaeology, Classics, and History of Art at Bryn Mawr College (2006–2014), and was appointed Leslie Clark Professor in the Humanities in 2019.

Conybeare's research centres on late antiquity, and especially on the writings of Augustine of Hippo. She was W. John Bennett Distinguished Visiting Scholar at the Pontifical Institute and the Centre for Medieval Studies in Toronto (2014), and has also held Visiting Fellowships at the Centre for Research in the Arts, Social Sciences and Humanities (CRASSH) at the University of Cambridge (2015) and at All Souls College, Oxford (2019–2020).

She has been the recipient of a number of awards and fellowships, including from the Guggenheim Foundation, the American Council of Learned Societies and the National Endowment for the Humanities (NEH).

Publications
Conybeare has published widely on such topics as aurality, touch, violence, and the self and is the author of The Routledge Guidebook to Augustine's Confessions (2016); The Laughter of Sarah: Biblical Exegesis, Feminist Theory, and the Concept of Delight (2013), which examines the place of delight in Judaeo-Christian interpretative tradition; The Irrational Augustine (2006) which charts Augustine's progress from neo-Platonism to incarnational theology in his Cassiciacum dialogues; and Paulinus Noster: Self and Symbols in the Letters of Paulinus of Nola (2000), looking at the formation of spiritual community through early Christian letter collections.

She is currently working on her next monograph, Augustine the African. She has recently co-edited  with Simon Goldhill Classical Philology and Theology: Entanglement, Disavowal, and the Godlike Scholar (2021).

Conybeare is also editor of the new series from Cambridge University Press, 'Cultures of Latin from Antiquity to the Enlightenment'.

Personal life
Conybeare has two sons: Gabriel (born 1994) and Hilary (born 2000). She is a keen amateur musician and learns the organ with Parker Kitterman at Christ Church, Philadelphia.

References

External links
Text of The Irrational Augustine (2006) – Google Books
Text of Paulinus Noster: Self and Symbols in the Letters of Paulinus of Nola (2000) – Google Books

1966 births
Living people
Academics from Bristol
People educated at Oxford High School, England
People educated at The King's School, Canterbury
Alumni of Corpus Christi College, Oxford
Classical scholars of the University of Manchester
Academics of the University of Manchester
University of Toronto alumni
Bryn Mawr College faculty
Fellows of the British Academy
Women philologists
British classical philologists
Scholars of Latin literature
ACLS Fellows